Drebrin is a protein that in humans is encoded by the DBN1 gene.

The protein encoded by this gene is a cytoplasmic actin-binding protein thought to play a role in the process of neuronal growth. It is a member of the drebrin family of proteins that are developmentally regulated in the brain. A decrease in the amount of this protein in the brain has been implicated as a possible contributing factor in the pathogenesis of memory disturbance in Alzheimer's disease. At least two alternative splice variants encoding different protein isoforms have been described for this gene.

Model organisms
Model organisms have been used in the study of DBN1 function. A conditional knockout mouse line called Dbn1tm1b(KOMP)Wtsi was generated at the Wellcome Trust Sanger Institute. Male and female animals underwent a standardized phenotypic screen to determine the effects of deletion. Additional screens performed: - In-depth immunological phenotyping

References

Further reading